Abba is a sub-prefecture of Nana-Mambéré in the Central African Republic.

History  
In May 2002, Abba became the capital of the fourth sub-prefecture of Nana-Mambéré by dismemberment of the sub-prefecture of Baboua . On 19 August 2020 rebel groups Return, Reclamation, Rehabilitation reportedly moved its headquarters there. On 5 March 2021 Abba was recaptured by government forces.

Education 
The municipality has two public schools in Abo-Boguirma and Abba and four private schools in Sagani, Lamy-Bony, Camp Café and Ndoké.

References 

Sub-prefectures of the Central African Republic
Populated places in the Central African Republic